Veikko Johan Kokkola (2 January 1911, Kotka – 19 February 1974) was a Finnish politician. He was a Member of the Parliament of Finland from 1951 to 1970, representing the Social Democratic Party of Finland (SDP).

References

1911 births
1974 deaths
People from Kotka
People from Viipuri Province (Grand Duchy of Finland)
Social Democratic Party of Finland politicians
Members of the Parliament of Finland (1951–54)
Members of the Parliament of Finland (1954–58)
Members of the Parliament of Finland (1958–62)
Members of the Parliament of Finland (1962–66)
Members of the Parliament of Finland (1966–70)